Bucculatrix asphyctella is a moth species of the family Bucculatricidae. It was first described by Edward Meyrick in 1880. It is found in Australia.

External links
Australian Faunal Directory

Moths of Australia
Bucculatricidae
Moths described in 1880
Taxa named by Edward Meyrick